Oedaspis dorsocentralis is a species of tephritid or fruit flies in the genus Oedaspis of the family Tephritidae.

Distribution
Russia, China.

References

Tephritinae
Insects described in 1938
Diptera of Asia